Dolno Egri is a village in the Bitola Municipality of North Macedonia. It used to be part of the former municipality of Bistrica.

According to the 2002 census, it has a population of 0. Ethnic groups in the village include:

References

Villages in Bitola Municipality